"The Most Dangerous Game" is a highly influential 1924 short story by Richard Connell. It tells the story of big-game hunter Sanger Rainsford becoming the hunted when trapped on a jungle island owned by General Zaroff, a Russian aristocrat who has turned to hunting man after growing bored of hunting animals. This story has been adapted into many works across many forms of media, including film, radio, television, and others.

Film 
 The Most Dangerous Game (1932; dir. Irving Pichel and Ernest B. Schoedsack): Produced by RKO Pictures and the first major film adaptation of the original work.
 A Game of Death (1945; dir. Robert Wise): Produced by RKO Pictures, this version changes Zaroff into "Erich Kreiger", a Nazi, and is set in the aftermath of World War II.
 Run for the Sun (1956; dir. Roy Boulting) stars Richard Widmark, Trevor Howard and Jane Greer.
 Bloodlust! (1961; dir. Ralph Brooke): Stars Wilton Graff as the Zaroff-type character, and Robert Reed as the leader of a band of youths who become stranded on the island.
Confessions of a Psycho Cat (1968; dir. Herb Stanley): An early sexploitation film taking place in New York City. Zaroff is replaced with a woman known as Virginia Marcus, who offers three acquitted murderers $100,000 if they can survive a night of her hunting them down. It takes little from the story apart from the concept of hunting humans for sport.
 The Suckers (1972; dir. Arthur Byrd): A sexploitation version, with the hunter using models as his prey.
 The Woman Hunt (1972; dir. Eddie Romero): Produced by Roger Corman for New World Pictures, it stars John Ashley and Sid Haig.
 Turkey Shoot (1982; dir. Brian Trenchard-Smith - originally released in the US as Escape 2000 and also known in the UK as Blood Camp Thatcher): Set in a country under a totalitarian rule, people labelled as "deviants" are sent to internment camps. At these establishments, the director allows the country's societal elite to use the "deviants" as game for their recreational hunting hobbies.
 Slave Girls from Beyond Infinity (1987; dir. Ken Dixon): A sci-fi/sexploitation where scantily-clad women are hunted on an alien world by a mad scientist, Zed.
 Deadly Prey (1987; dir. David A. Prior): A former soldier is kidnapped by mercenaries who train by hunting innocent people.
Hard Target (1993; dir. John Woo): In New Orleans, homeless Vietnam War veterans voluntarily serve as human prey for the hunt.
 Surviving the Game (1994; dir. Ernest Dickerson): Starring Rutger Hauer, Ice-T and Charles S. Dutton, it depicts a homeless man who is hired as a survival guide for a group of wealthy businessmen on a hunting trip in the mountains.
 The Pest (1997; dir. Paul Miller): A comedic parody, with German huntsman Gustav Shank (Jeffrey Jones) accidentally bringing teenage Puerto Rican hustler Pestario "Pest" Vargas (John Leguizamo) to his island instead of the skilled athlete he had intended to hunt, only to decide to hunt the Pest anyway due to his sheer obnoxiousness.
 The Eliminator (2004; dir. Ken Barbet): Seven captured people are hunted at night for sport on an island as a betting game for the wealthy.
 Never Leave Alive (2017; dir. Steven LaMorte): Stars WWE wrestler John Hennigan.
The Hunt (2020; dir. Craig Zobel): A contemporary retelling, involving liberal elites hunting "deplorables" in and around a manor in Croatia.
 Tremors: Shrieker Island (2020; dir. Don Michael Paul): In the seventh installment of the Tremors franchise, Burt Gummer and several other unlucky people are trapped on an island with a trophy hunter, who hunts graboids for sport.
 Apex (2021; dir. Edward John Drake): An ex-cop serving a life sentence for a crime he didn’t commit is offered a chance at freedom if he can survive a deadly game in which a group of hunters pay for the pleasure of hunting another human on a remote island.
 The Most Dangerous Game (2022; dir. Justin Lee): A remake of the 1932 film.
 Death Hunt (2022; dir. Neil Mackay): A Canadian film variation on The Most Dangerous Game, as a couple is captured and hunted in the woods by three local men.

Radio 
"The Most Dangerous Game" has been presented four times as a radio play:

 The CBS radio program Suspense featured two separate adaptations of the story. The first, airing September 23, 1943, starred Orson Welles as Zaroff and Keenan Wynn as Rainsford. A second episode, aired on February 1, 1945, starred J. Carrol Naish as Zaroff and Joseph Cotten as Rainsford. Both Suspense productions presented an adaptation by Jack Finke in which Rainsford narrates the story in retrospect as he waits in Zaroff's bedroom for the final confrontation.
 The CBS radio program Escape also featured an adaptation of the story, airing October 1, 1947.
 The radio show Tales of Fatima aired an adaptation on September 24, 1949, featuring Basil Rathbone and Rex Harrison.

Television 

 Have Gun Will Travel, "The Hunt" (1962), Paladin is lured to Oregon by a widow, so that a bored Russian prince named Boris Radachev (Leonid Kinskey) can hunt him and her; "The Black Bull" (1963) Paladin is hunted in a bullring by an insane  matador (Carlos Romero)

 The Wild Wild West, "The Night of Sudden Death" (1965), Jim West and a circus girl are trapped inside an Africa Reserve wild animal park in Colorado and are hunted by an insane big-game hunter Warren (Robert Loggia).

 Get Smart, "Island of the Darned" (1966), Agents 86 and 99 are trapped on an island with a mad KAOS killer Hans Hunter (Harold Gould), a German hunting fanatic who resembles the villain from A Game of Death (1945).

 Star Trek: The Original Series, "The Squire of Gothos" (1966), a childlike, seemingly all-powerful being named Trelane kidnaps and hunts Captain Kirk.

 Gilligan's Island, "The Hunter" (1967), big-game hunter Jonathan Kincaid (Rory Calhoun) turns his sights on Gilligan when he realizes there are no wild animals on the island.

 Lost In Space, "Hunter's Moon" (1967), Professor Robinson (Guy Williams) is forced into being a human prey and hunted by an alien named Megazor.

 I Spy, "The Name of the Game" (1968), Agents Kelly and Scott are pursued through the jungle in Mexico by a crazed former American general with paranoid delusions.

 Bonanza, "The Hunter" (1973), a deranged killer, Corporal Bill Tanner (Tom Skerritt), who is a former tracker for the United States Army, hunts Little Joe (Michael Landon).

 Fantasy Island, pilot episode (1977), a big-game hunter comes to the island to be hunted by a man, a twist on the usual version, in which the hunted participates against his will.

 The Incredible Hulk episode "The Snare" has fugitive scientist David Banner trapped on a private island owned by an insane hunter who not only craves the challenge of hunting humans, but considers the discovery of Banner's powerful Hulk form as a sign of a quarry who is even more of an appealing challenge.

 Hart to Hart, "Hunted Harts" (4:11, 1983), the Harts are lured to South America to be hunted by a big game hunter. 

 Xena: Warrior Princess, "Dangerous Prey" (6:11, 2001), Xena goes after Prince Morloch, who is hunting the Amazon women as if they were animals.

 The Simpsons Halloween special "Treehouse of Horror XVI" contained a segment titled "Survival of the Fattest" which parodied the story closely. In this segment Mr. Burns invited much of the cast to his hunting lodge on a private island, only to reveal that he intended to hunt them all for sport. Another episode makes a reference to "The Most Dangerous Game" when Rainier Wolfcastle says that he bought a YMCA to demolish it and install a hunting ground dedicated to "hunt the most dangerous animal of all... Man."
 In an episode of the animated sitcom American Dad!, the Smith family and a young woman become stranded on an island after Francine jumps off a cruise. Stan goes up to the mansion on this island to ask for help, but the inhabitants say that they are going to hunt the family. The Smiths and the young woman become trapped in a cave, where the young woman dies and they eat her to survive. The hunters then break into the cave and shoot the family. Stan sits up, realizing it is paint. At a party later, the hunters reveal that nobody really dies on The Most Dangerous Game Island.

 In Season 2, Episode 21 of Criminal Minds, "Open Season", two brothers capture people stranded in a remote region of the wilderness outside Challis, Idaho, release them into the hills, and hunt them with compound bows for sport, referring the men as "bucks" and the women as "does."
 In Season 13, Episode 15 of Law and Order: SVU, "Hunting Ground", a serial rapist and killer lures female escorts after their date to a remote area where he sets them free while he hunts them down to recapture them again.
 In the Disney animated series The Mighty Ducks "The Most Dangerous Duck Hunt" episode, the heroes are trapped on an island and hunted.
 In a "Dial M for Monkey" segment of the animated series Dexter's Laboratory, the hero, Monkey, is trapped by an alien big-game hunter named "Huntor," who also makes a cameo among a league of Hunters of "Sumarai Jack" in the Cartoon Network cartoon series Samurai Jack.
 In Season 1, Episode 15 of Supernatural, "The Benders", a family has been behind disappearances in a city. The family snatches victims to hunt and kill. Sam and a police officer are taken, but Dean finds them and helps them subdue the family before it can cause them any harm.
 In Season 7, Episode 12 of Futurama, "31st Century Fox", Bender becomes the target of a fox hunting club and is referred to as "the most dangerous game."
 In Season 2 Episode 6 of The Blacklist, Elizabeth Keen and her FBI task force encounter a family in Idaho who trained the mother's youngest son to hunt and kill humans kidnapped by the eldest son.
 The Outer Limits 1998 episode "The Hunt" is a story in which the hunting of animals has been banned by environmentalists and black market hunting of obsolete androids takes its place.
 In the Season 3, Episode 5 episode of Archer, "El Contador", Lana and Archer are hunted by a drug lord.
 Influence is seen in the Season 3, Episode 22 episode of Riverdale, "Chapter Fifty-Seven: Survive the Night".
 In Season 4, Episode 2 of Game of Thrones, there is a scene in which Ramsay Bolton hunts a woman. She is cornered by the hunting party and eaten alive by Ramsay's dogs. It is implied that this was not the only time Ramsay indulged in human hunting "for sport."
 In Season 3, Episodes 21 and 22 of Star Wars: The Clone Wars, Ahsoka Tano, Chewbacca and a group of Jedi Padawans are hunted on an island.
 An episode of the animated series Johnny Bravo entitled "Hunted!" is a parody of the story. The titular Johnny is forced to go through the same ordeal, but his stupidity and foolishness greatly frustrates the hunter, who eventually allows him to leave.

 In season 3 of Wrecked, the plane crash survivors land on another island, where four wealthy men make them hunt each other, then hunting the survivor.
 The Kids Next Door episode "Operation: S.A.F.A.R.I" is based on The Most Dangerous Game.
 The short-form mobile video platform Quibi released an adaptation called Most Dangerous Game starring Liam Hemsworth and Christoph Waltz. It takes place in modern-day Detroit where a dying man named Dodge agrees to be hunted for sport over a 24-hour period to earn money to leave his wife and unborn child.
 In the Netflix series W/ Bob & David, episode 3 has a skit based on The Most Dangerous Game.

Other adaptations 

The story has also served as an inspiration for books and films like Seventh Victim, Battle Royale, Predator, Predators, The Running Man, The Pest  and The Hunger Games.

 The Spider-Man villain, Kraven the Hunter, was inspired from Zaroff.
 In the comic book issue Daredevil #4, Daredevil fights a mad manhunter on a remote island.
 In Clive Cussler's book Dragon Dirk Pitt is chased by "Kamatori" on Soseki Island.
 In the comic-book story "A-Hunting We Will Go", Scrooge McDuck and his relatives are on a jungle island hunted by a baron with his hounds.
 In the video game Hitman: Contracts, the mission "Beldingford Manor" takes inspiration from this story.
 In the video game Rayman 3: Hoodlum Havoc, the character Count Razoff takes inspiration from General Zaroff, even sharing similar names.
 In the video game The Elder Scrolls IV: Oblivion, the quest "Caught in the Hunt" is inspired by this story.
 In the online game Poptropica, the five-part Survival Island features the player in a situation much like the one in the original story. At the end of the third episode, the player is rescued by a hunter known as Myron van Buren. The fourth episode revolves around the player in van Buren's cabin, finding out that van Buren plans to hunt them. In the fifth episode, the player teams up with another victim of van Buren to defeat him by trapping him in a waterwheel.
 In the anime series Psycho-Pass, episodes 10 and 11 feature a wealthy cyborg tycoon who dons gentleman's hunting gear and hunts people in an underground maze with his robotic hounds.
 In Don Pendleton's The Executioner series, book #441, called Murder Island, has a similar plot to The Most Dangerous Game. The protagonist, Mack "The Executioner" Bolan (a vigilante/government agent) encounters a rich businessman hunter on an island while on a mission and ends up in a similar position as the Rainsford character, while the rich hunter takes a similar role as Zaroff.
 In the comic-book story "The Second Most Dangerous Game" (serialized in Martian Comics #8–10), Martians possess humans to continue their tradition of hunting other humans, after the practice has been outlawed. Richard Connell is a character.
 In a song called "Fly on the Wall" by Joey Pecoraro, the opening interaction between Rainsford and General Zaroff is used as a prelude to the actual song.
 In 1987, American Metal band Lȧȧz Rockit retold the story in their song "Most Dangerous Game" on their album Know Your Enemy.
 The Rooster Teeth series "Let's Play Minecraft" featured an adaptation of the story into a game played by the show's cast members in the video game Minecraft, where one player was given a map and hunted by the other five in and around the in-game world created by the Achievement Hunter cast members.
 A translated version was published in Malayalam as an audio book by Kathacafe in 2017.
 Zaroff, a Franco-Belgian graphic novel written by Sylvain Runberg with art by Francois Miville-Deschenes and published by Le Lombard and Dargaud in 2019, is presented as a sequel to Connell's story. Here, Zaroff survived against Rainsford, whose account to authorities is dismissed as a hoax, so Zaroff and his remaining men escape to another island to continue hunting.

References

Sources

 

Most Dangerous Game, The